Ragwon Station is a station on Hyŏksin Line of the Pyongyang Metro.

The station features mosaic mural Masters of the Country.

Nearby attractions
 Korea Central Zoo
 Mount Taesongsan
 Central Botanical Gardens
 Pyongyang Memorial Park

References

Pyongyang Metro stations
Railway stations opened in 1975
1975 establishments in North Korea